Serap Yücesir (*18 March 1973 in Kars, Turkey) is a former Turkish female basketball player. The 1.91 m (6' 3") national competitor played in the power forward position.

She started basketball in her age of 13 with Bayraklıspor in İzmir and played later for Urla Gençlik. Yücesir moved to Fenerbahçe İstanbul in 1990, where she played 13 seasons long. She transferred then to Galatasaray Medical Park, but returned to her previous club after one season. The captain won 12 championship titles. After playing for Istanbul University, she transferred in the season 2007-2008 to Turkish Women's Basketball League team  Panküp TED Kayseri College. After ending her active sports career, she serves together with her former teammate Arzu Özyiğit as trainer in a women's basketball school in Kartal, Istanbul.

Yücesir played in the gold medal winning national team at the 2005 Mediterranean Games in Almería, Spain.

Yücesir studied pharmacy, although she had not been able to perform her profession because of basketball, she has now been running her own community pharmacy in Maltepe, Istanbul. She is married with a son.

Achievements with Fenerbahçe
Turkish Championship
Winners (4): 1999, 2002, 2004, 2006
Turkish Federation Cup
Winners (6): 1999, 2000, 2001, 2004, 2005, 2006
Turkish Super Cup
Winners (5): 1999, 2000, 2001, 2004, 2005

See also
 Turkish women in sports

References

1973 births
Living people
Turkish women's basketball players
Fenerbahçe women's basketball players
Galatasaray S.K. (women's basketball) players
Turkish pharmacists
Sportspeople from Kars
Power forwards (basketball)
Istanbul University alumni
Women pharmacists